HD 27631 b is an extrasolar planet that has more mass than Jupiter. It orbits 3.25 AU from the star, taking six years to revolve around the parent star HD 27631. Its orbit is eccentric, around 12%.

References

External links 
 

Exoplanets discovered in 2011
Giant planets
Horologium (constellation)
Exoplanets detected by radial velocity